Olaf Lodal (6 July 1885 – 31 August 1969) was a Danish long-distance runner. He competed in the marathon at the 1912 Summer Olympics.

References

External links
 

1885 births
1969 deaths
People from Greve Municipality
Athletes (track and field) at the 1912 Summer Olympics
Danish male long-distance runners
Danish male marathon runners
Olympic athletes of Denmark
Sportspeople from Region Zealand